Federal elections were held in Germany on 31 July 1932, following the premature dissolution of the Reichstag. The Nazi Party made significant gains and became the largest party in the Reichstag for the first time, although they failed to win a majority. The Communist Party increased their vote share as well. All other parties combined held less than half the seats in the Reichstag, meaning no majority coalition government could be formed without including at least one of these two parties.

Background

Since 1929, Germany had been suffering from the Great Depression; unemployment had risen from 8.5% to nearly 30% between 1929 and 1932, while industrial production dropped by around 42%. In March 1930, the governing grand coalition of the pro-republican parties–the Social Democratic Party (SPD), the Centre Party and both liberal parties–collapsed. President Paul von Hindenburg appointed a minority government, headed by the Centre Party's Heinrich Brüning, which could only govern by using Hindenburg's emergency powers. The September 1930 elections  produced a highly fragmented Reichstag, making the formation of a stable government impossible. The elections also saw the Nazi Party rise to national prominence, gaining 95 seats.

Brüning's policies, implemented via presidential decree and tolerated by parliament, failed to solve the economic crisis and weakened the parliamentary system. In March 1932, the presidential elections began as a three-way race between the incumbent Hindenburg, supported by pro-democratic parties, against Hitler on the one hand and the Communist Ernst Thälmann on the other. Hitler received around a third of the vote and was defeated in the second round in April by Hindenburg, who won a narrow majority. However, at the end of May 1932, Hindenburg was persuaded to dismiss Brüning as chancellor and replaced him with Franz von Papen, a renegade from the Centre Party, and a non-partisan "Cabinet of Barons". Papen's cabinet had almost no support in the Reichstag. Only three days after his appointment, he was faced with such opposition that he had Hindenburg dissolve the Reichstag and call new elections for 31 July so that the Reichstag could not dismiss him immediately.

Campaign
The election campaign took place under violent circumstances, as Papen lifted the token ban on the SA, the Nazi paramilitary, which Brüning had put in place during the last days of his administration. That inevitably led to clashes with the Communist paramilitary.

Results
The elections resulted in significant gains by the Nazi Party; with 230 seats, it became the largest party in parliament for the first time, but lacked an overall majority. Neither the Nazi Party nor Hindenburg had a governing majority, and the other parties refused to co-operate, meaning no coalition government with a majority could be formed. Papen's minority government continued in office, leading to another early election in November.

Nazi Party vote share by constituency

See also
Oskar Daubmann

References

1932 07
1932 07
Federal
Germany
Germany